The United States Adult Soccer Association (USASA) is a national organization for amateur soccer in the United States. It consists of 55 state organizations as well as national, regional and state leagues.

The National Premier Soccer League, NISA Nation and United Premier Soccer League are USASA national affiliates designed to promote a higher level of competition than the state organizations. USASA also affiliates the Women's Premier Soccer League, one of the unrecognized third division leagues below the fully professional NWSL. USL League Two was once affiliated with USASA but is now its own player registration organization.

USASA has over 250,000 adult members within its leagues and teams.

Organization
State and local associations operate leagues under the umbrella of the USASA. The national organization is split into four regions:

National Tier Structure 
In 2018, the USASA introduced a tiered system for amateur soccer. Three tiers with standard requirements include: Tiers I and II are designed for leagues that have or wish to have a national footprint. Tier III is for leagues that operate in multiple states.

In addition to general requirements of all member leagues, Tiers I, II and III must meet these criteria:

Affiliated Amateur Adult Leagues

Competitions

Hank Steinbrecher Cup 
In 2013, USASA began a competition to pit the champions of the different men's amateur competitions (USASA National Amateur Cup, NPSL, USL2 and defending cup holder) against each other for the title of "USA National Amateur Champions."

National Amateur Cup

See also 
 List of USASA affiliated leagues
 National Amateur Cup

References

External links
USASA
USASA Adult Soccer Fest

 
Soccer governing bodies in the United States
1995 establishments in the United States
Sports organizations established in 1995